Bulmer's tree frog (Litoria bulmeri) is a species of frog in the subfamily Pelodryadinae.
It is found in Papua New Guinea and possibly West Papua in Indonesia.
Its natural habitats are subtropical or tropical moist montane forests and rivers.
The frog is named after Ralph Bulmer, an anthropologist who studied the Kalam language, people, and culture of Papua New Guinea.

References

Litoria
Amphibians of Papua New Guinea
Amphibians described in 1968
Taxonomy articles created by Polbot